Beausejour or Beauséjour may refer to:

Places
Beausejour, a district in Casablanca, Morocco
Beauséjour, the main settlement on the island of La Désirade, Guadeloupe
Beauséjour (electoral district), a federal electoral district in eastern New Brunswick, Canada
Beausejour, Manitoba, a town in Manitoba, Canada
Beausejour Blades, former ice hockey team in Beausejour
Beauséjour, Marne, a town in France, a scene of fighting during World War I
Beauséjour River, a river in Grenada
Beausejour Stadium,  a cricket stadium located near Gros Islet, Saint Lucia
CFS Beausejour, former Canadian Forces Station
Fort Beauséjour, a National Historic Site located in Aulac, New Brunswick, Canada
Battle of Fort Beauséjour

People
Henoc Beauséjour (born 1973), known by his stage name Roi Heenok, Canadian rapper, producer and entrepreneur
Jean Beausejour, a Chilean footballer
Madeleine Beauséjour, film editor and director from Réunion
Paul-Félix Beuvain de Beauséjour (1839–1930), French clergyman